Sultana, also known as Sultana Razaaq, was one of the earliest film actresses from India and acted both in silent films and later in sound films. She was a daughter of India’s first female film director, Fatima Begum. Zubeida (leading actress of India's first talkie film Alam Ara (1931)) was her younger sister.

Sultana was born in Surat, Gujarat in western India. She had two sisters, Zubeida and Shehzadi, both actresses. Their mother, Fatima Begum, claimed that her three daughters were fathered by Nawab Sidi Ibrahim Muhammad Yakut Khan III of Sachin State. However, there is no record of a marriage or any contract having taken place between the Nawab and Fatima Begum or of the Nawab having recognized any of her children as his own, a prerequisite for legal paternity in Muslim family law.

Career
Sultana was a popular actress in the silent movie era, usually cast in romantic roles.  She started her career as actress in Veer Abhimanyu (1922) film and later performed in several silent films. Later, she also acted in talkie movies. When India was partitioned in 1947, she migrated to Pakistan with her husband, a wealthy man named Seth Razaaq. Her daughter, Jamila Razaaq, also became an actress with her encouragement. She produced a film in Pakistan, named Hum Ek Hain (1961), written by famous scriptwriter, Fayyaz Hashmi.  The film was partly shot in colour, which was rare those days, but it failed miserably and Sultana stopped producing any films afterwards.

Sultana's daughter, Jamila Razaaq, married the well known Pakistani cricketer Waqar Hasan, who is the brother of filmmaker Iqbal Shehzad. He runs a business under the name National Foods at Karachi.

Filmography

Silent Movies

Talkie Movies

Producer

References

External links
 Sultana brief biography
 List of films
 

Year of birth missing
Year of death missing
20th-century Indian actresses
Actresses in Hindi cinema
Gujarati people
Indian film actresses
Indian silent film actresses
Pakistani people of Gujarati descent
People from British India